Marc Delaroche (born 18 April 1971) is a retired French football goalkeeper.

References

1971 births
Living people
French footballers
AS Monaco FC players
Stade Malherbe Caen players
FC Girondins de Bordeaux players
Nîmes Olympique players
Association football goalkeepers
Ligue 1 players
Ligue 2 players
People from Creil
Sportspeople from Oise
Footballers from Hauts-de-France